Matthew Sanchez is the name of:

Matt Sanchez (born 1970), American journalist
Matthew Sanchez (soccer) (born 1994), Puerto Rican soccer player